Elections to the Baseball Hall of Fame for 1972 followed the system established one year earlier. 
The Baseball Writers' Association of America (BBWAA) voted by mail to select from recent major league players and elected three: Yogi Berra, Sandy Koufax, and Early Wynn. The Veterans Committee met in closed sessions to consider executives, managers, umpires, and earlier major league players. It also selected three people: Lefty Gomez, Will Harridge, and Ross Youngs. The Negro Leagues Committee met for the second time and selected Josh Gibson and Buck Leonard. A formal induction ceremony was held in Cooperstown, New York, on August 7, 1972, with Commissioner of Baseball Bowie Kuhn presiding.

BBWAA election

The BBWAA was authorized to elect players active in 1952 or later, but not after 1966; the ballot included candidates from the 1971 ballot who received at least 5% of the vote but were not elected, along with selected players, chosen by a screening committee, whose last appearance was in 1966. All 10-year members of the BBWAA were eligible to vote.

Voters were instructed to cast votes for up to 10 candidates; any candidate receiving votes on at least 75% of the ballots would be honored with induction to the Hall. The ballot consisted of 46 players; a total of 396 ballots were cast, with 297 votes required for election. A total of 3,083 individual votes were cast, an average of 7.79 per ballot.

Candidates who were eligible for the first time are indicated here with a dagger (†). The three candidates who received at least 75% of the vote and were elected are indicated in bold italics; candidates who have since been elected in subsequent elections are indicated in italics.

Charlie Keller was on the ballot for the final time.

Players eligible for the first time who were not included on the ballot were: Joe Adcock, Ed Bailey, Don Blasingame, Frank Bolling, Wes Covington, Roger Craig, Del Crandall, Joe Cunningham, Gene Freese, Bob Friend, Jim Gilliam, Ray Herbert, Billy Hoeft, Joey Jay, Eddie Kasko, Marty Keough, Héctor López, Jerry Lynch, Frank Malzone, Félix Mantilla, Joe Nuxhall, Bob Purkey, Steve Ridzik, Ed Roebuck, Bob Skinner and Frank Thomas.

J. G. Taylor Spink Award 
Frank Graham (1893–1965) received the J. G. Taylor Spink Award honoring a baseball writer. The award was voted at the December 1971 meeting of the BBWAA, and included in the summer 1972 ceremonies.

References

External links
1972 Election at www.baseballhalloffame.org

Baseball Hall of Fame balloting
Hall of Fame balloting